Cockrell is an unincorporated community in Jackson County, in the U.S. state of Missouri.

History
A post office called Cockrell was established in 1886, and remained in operation until 1902. The community has the name of Francis Cockrell, a state legislator.

References

Unincorporated communities in Jackson County, Missouri
Unincorporated communities in Missouri